Lamut may be:
Lamut, Ifugao, in the Philippines
Lamuts, more commonly known as Evens, an ethnic group of Russia
Lamut language, more commonly known as the Even language

See also
Murder in LaMut, a 2002 novel by Raymond E. Feist and Joel Rosenberg

Language and nationality disambiguation pages